Linus Persson may refer to:

Linus Persson (ice hockey) (born 1985), Swedish ice hockey right winger
Linus Persson (handballer) (born 1993), Swedish handball player